Amoria is a taxonomic genus of medium-sized predatory marine gastropod in the family Volutidae.

Distribution
Amoria are found in onshore and offshore waters around the entire coast of Australia. Several species extend into offshore waters of southern Indonesia. The highest areas of diversity are in the intertidal and shallow subtidal waters of northern Western Australia followed by the subtidal waters around the Great Barrier Reef in Queensland.

Shell description
Amoria have a small, smooth, more or less pointed conical protoconch, a solid very glossy, fusiform shell and an elongate aperture with 4 distinct, more or less developed columellar plicae. The sutures are slightly callous. The colour pattern of the genus Amoria is variable, the base colour is white, yellow or pink with varying degrees or brown axial lines forming a pattern over the base colour. Axial lines may be free or may reticulate to form a tented pattern.

The largest species Amoria hunteri reaches over 200 mm in length. The smallest species is probably Amoria dampieria frequently around 20 mm.

Biology
Amoria are nocturnal and prey on other gastropods and on bivalves. They generally inhabit areas with well sorted coarse sand. Some Amoria species have been noted to bite people when they are handled. The bite is followed by a mild sting, but no long-term effects have been noted.

Fossil history
The first Amoria appear in the Eocene and Late Miocene from Victoria. Judging from anatomical features, Amoria are close to the genus Cymbiola from which they descended in the Tertiary. Cymbiola are related to Tethyan species of the Late Miocene of Indonesia, Java.

Taxonomy
Amoria includes 20-30 species. The following species have been recognized:

 Amoria benthalis McMichael, 1964 - Queensland, New South Wales
 Amoria canaliculata McCoy, 1869 - Queensland
 Amoria chaneyi Morrison, 2012 
 Amoria damonii Gray, 1864 - Western and Northern Australia
 Amoria dampieria Weaver, 1960 - Dampier Archipelago
 Amoria diamantina Wilson, 1972 - Western Australia
 Amoria ellioti (Sowerby II, 1864) - Western Australia
 Amoria exoptanda (Reeve, 1849) - Southern Australia
 Amoria grayi Ludbrook, 1953 - Western Australia
 Amoria guttata McMichael, 1964 - Queensland
 Amoria hansenae Morrison, 2012
 Amoria hunteri (Iredale, 1931) - Eastern Australia
 Amoria jamrachii Gray, 1864 - Western Australia
 Amoria jansae van Pel & Moolenbeek, 2010
 Amoria lineola Bail & Limpus, 2009
 Amoria macandrewi (Sowerby III, 1887) - Western Australia
 Amoria maculata (Swainson, 1822) - Eastern Australia
 Amoria mihali H. Morrison, 2018
 Amoria molleri (Iredale, 1836) - Queensland
 Amoria necopinata Darragh, 1983 - Queensland
 Amoria peterstimpsoni Cossignani & Allary, 2019
 Amoria praetexta (Reeve, 1849) - Western Australia
 Amoria rinkensi Poppe, 1986 - Northwestern Australia
 Amoria ryosukei Habe, 1975 - Arafura, Timor Sea
 Amoria simoneae Bail & Limpus, 2003
 Amoria spenceriana (Gatliff, 1908) - Ashmore Reef
 Amoria stricklandi Bail & Limpus, 2016
 Amoria subfossilis Bail & Limpus, 2011
 Amoria turneri (Griffith & Pidgeon, 1834) - Western and Northern Australia
 Amoria undulata (Lamarck, 1804) - Western, Southern and Eastern Australia
 Amoria volva 
 Amoria weldensis Bail & Limpus, 2001 - Western Australia
 Amoria zebra (Leach, 1814) - Eastern Australia
Species brought into synonymy
 Amoria kawamurai Habe, 1975 - Arafura, Timor Sea: synonym of the subspecies Amoria grayi kawamurai Habe, 19
 Amoria kingi Cox, 1871: synonym of Amoria undulata (Lamarck, 1804)
 Amoria newmanae Cotton, 1949: synonym of Amoria turneri (Gray in Griffith & Pidgeon, 1834)

Many subspecific names have been created in the genus Amoria to distinguish colour variations in the shells of the species.

References

 N.H. Ludbrook (1953), Systematic Revision of the Volutidid Genus Amoria, J. Mollus. Stud. 30 (4-5): 131-153.
 Bail, P., Limpus, A. & Poppe, G. T. (2001): The Genus Amoria. In: Poppe, G. T. & Groh, K.: A Conchological Iconography. 50 pp., 93 plts. ConchBooks, Hackenheim, .
 Wilson, B. (1994): Australian marine shells 2. Odyssey Publishing, Kallaroo, Western Australia, .

External links
 Biodiversity library: journals describing or mentioning Amoria

Volutidae
Gastropod genera
Taxa named by John Edward Gray